Cats & Dogs: Paws 3 Unite! is a 2020 American spy action comedy film, starring the voices of Melissa Rauch, Max Greenfield, and George Lopez. It is a stand-alone sequel to 2010's Cats & Dogs: The Revenge of Kitty Galore and the third and final film of the Cats & Dogs film series. Unlike the first two installments, Paws Unite! was released straight to video in the United States on September 15, 2020. It is also the only film that does not feature any cast members from the previous installments.

Plot 
The film covers the adventures of two F.A.R.T. (Furry Animals Rivalry Termination) agents, Roger and Gwen, who live in the same building in the suburbs of Seattle as their owners.

Cast 
 Callum Seagram Airlie as Max Harper
 Kirsten Robek as Susan Harper
 Sarah Giles as Zoe
 John Murphy as Ollie
 Michael Daingerfield as News Reporter
 Princess Davis as Student Reporter
 Kareem Malcolm as Coach
 Andy Thompson as Paw Street Market Manager
 Matt Afonso as Store Clerk/Slacker Employee
 James Rha as Veterinarian
 Pauline Newstone as Sis
 Ryan Jefferson Booth as Maintenance Man
 Natalie Von Rotsburg as Pablo's New Mom
 Teague Higgins as Terrified Teen
 Akiz Aguma as Lost Little Boy
 Maya Victoria Mateo as Kid 1
 Ava Kelders as Kid 2
 Jojo Ahenkorah as Record Executive

Voice cast 
 Max Greenfield as Roger the Border Collie
 Melissa Rauch as Gwen the Cat
 George Lopez as Pablo the Cockatoo
 Paul Dobson as Zeek the Tegu Lizard
 Garry Chalk as Old Ed
 Sunni Westbrook as Snarky
 Christina Meredith Lewall as Shaggy Dog
 Michael Daingerfield as Duke
 Megan Peta Hill as Siri
 Noel Johansen as Schnauzer
 Ian Hanlin as K9 Shepherd
 Andrea Libman as Fish
 Ingrid Nilson as Shelly
 Edwin Perez as Other Dogs 1 and 2

Production 
In 2010, it was announced that Cats & Dogs 3 was in the works. Not much was heard about the sequel until January 2020 when filming began in Los Angeles and Vancouver, Canada.

Release 
The film was released digitally on September 15, 2020 and on DVD and on Blu-ray on October 13, 2020 in the United States in contrast to the first two films, which were released theatrically. It was, however, given a theatrical release in other countries.

Reception 
Reviewing for The Guardian, Leslie Felperin  gave a rating of three stars from five with criticism of the CGI effects and lack of wit.
Jack Bottomley for Starburst magazine gave one star  from five; criticising the story as cliched, as well as a lack of energy, poor CGI, and a deficient sense of humour. He commented that the film " ... is a pavement foul of a trilogy closer ...". The Times critic Kevin Maher felt that the plot was " ... grim and preachy ...", giving a score of one star from five For The Herald Sun, Leigh Paatsch criticised the plot as generic and commented that the film was only suitable for "... early prime schoolers...", giving a score of 2 stars from five. Jennifer Green of Common Sense Media gave a rating of three stars from five; praising some of the humour - particularly from comedian George Lopez " ... in a hilarious turn as a cockatoo who just needs a little love" ... .

References

External links 
 
 
 

2020s English-language films
Films directed by Sean McNamara
Films about animals
Films about cats
Films about dogs
Films set in Seattle
Animated films about mice
2020 films
American action comedy films
Direct-to-video sequel films
Warner Bros. direct-to-video films
Cats & Dogs (film series)
2020s American films